Arden/Del Paso station is an at-grade light rail station on the Blue Line of the Sacramento RT Light Rail system operated by the Sacramento Regional Transit District. The station is located alongside Arden Way at its intersection with Del Paso Boulevard, after which the station is named, in the city of Sacramento, California.

The station serves as a major bus transfer point and is served by six routes. The station also has a small 45 space park and ride lot.

References

External links 
 Arden Del Paso Station Economic Profile

Sacramento Regional Transit light rail stations
Railway stations in the United States opened in 1987
1987 establishments in California